The 1981 Texas A&M Aggies football team represented Texas A&M University in the 1981 NCAA Division I-A football season as a member of the Southwest Conference (SWC). The Aggies were led by head coach Tom Wilson in his fourth season and finished with a record of seven wins and five losses (7–5 overall, 4–4 in the SWC) and with a victory in the Independence Bowl.

Schedule

Roster
QB Gary Kubiak

References

Texas AandM Aggies
Texas A&M Aggies football seasons
Independence Bowl champion seasons
Texas AandM Aggies football